Miamimyiops is a genus of parasitic flies in the family Tachinidae.

Species
Miamimyiops mattoensis Townsend, 1939

Distribution
Brazil.

References

Diptera of South America
Monotypic Brachycera genera
Exoristinae
Tachinidae genera
Taxa named by Charles Henry Tyler Townsend